Tan Tee Beng (born 21 February 1972) is a Malaysian independent politician. From 2008 to 2013 he was the Member of the Parliament of Malaysia for the Nibong Tebal constituency in Penang, Malaysia.

Tan was elected to Parliament in the 2008 general election for the opposition National Justice Party (KeADILan) which later change to People's Justice Party (PKR) party, unseating Zainal Abidin Osman, a government Minister. On 1 March 2010, Tan announced he was leaving PKR to sit as an Independent member of Parliament. His resignation from PKR followed the instigation of disciplinary action against him by the party after he criticised Penang Chief Minister Lim Guan Eng from the party's Pakatan Rakyat coalition partner the Democratic Action Party. Tan has later announced he join Parti Kesejahteraan Insan Tanah Air (KITA) on 24 February 2011. But he was sacked from KITA on 7 February 2012 allegedly for making statement disparaging the party. Tan contested as an Independent candidate in a four-corner fight for Nibong Tebal parliamentary seat in the 2018 general election but lost.

Tan's father, Datuk Tan Gim Hwa, was a founding member of the Parti Gerakan Rakyat Malaysia (GERAKAN), a coalition party the ruling Barisan Nasional (BN) government), and even Tan himself before joining PKR is a former official in Gerakan's youth wing. He was the GERAKAN's candidate for the Penang State Legislative Assembly seat of Batu Lancang in the 1999 general election which he lost by a slim majority.

Before entering politics, Tan was a stockbroker. He obtained a Bachelor of Laws from Middlesex University.

Election results

See also
Nibong Tebal (federal constituency)

References

1972 births
Living people
People from Penang
Malaysian politicians of Chinese descent
Former Parti Gerakan Rakyat Malaysia politicians
Former People's Justice Party (Malaysia) politicians
People's Welfare Party (Malaysia) politicians
Independent politicians in Malaysia
Members of the Dewan Rakyat
Alumni of Middlesex University
21st-century Malaysian politicians